Cornelius Kempius (1516 - Groningen, 1589) was a Dutch historian who is known for his work on Friesland.

Biography
Kempius was born into a Catholic family in Dokkum, and after going to school in Groningen he studied law, and received his master's degree, in Cologne. His magnum opus is De origine, situ, qualitate et quantitate Frisia, et rebus a Frisiis olim praeclare gestis (Cologne, 1588). His booklet discusses the history, geography, and notoriety of Friesland.

References

Habsburg Netherlands historians
1516 births
1589 deaths